Imhoffiella purpurea is a Gram-negative, phototrophic and motile bacterium from the genus of Imhoffiella which has been isolated from coastal water from Visakhapatnam in India.

References 

Chromatiales
Bacteria described in 2017